In J.R.R. Tolkien's legendarium, Gondolin was a secret city of Elves in the First Age of Middle-earth. The story of the Fall of Gondolin tells of the arrival there of Tuor, a prince of Men; of the betrayal of the city to Morgoth by the king's nephew, Maeglin; and of its subsequent siege and catastrophic destruction by Morgoth's armies. It also relates the flight of the fugitives to the Havens of Sirion, the wedding of Tuor and Idril, and the childhood of their son Eärendil.

Scholars have noted the presence of tank-like iron fighting machines in Morgoth's army in early versions of the story, written soon after Tolkien returned from the Battle of the Somme. They have likened the story of the Fall of Gondolin to the sack of Troy in ancient Greek literature, or to Virgil's Aeneid; the role of Tuor's wife Idril has similarly been compared to that of Cassandra or Helen of Troy in accounts of the Trojan War.

City

Foundation 

The city of Gondolin in Beleriand, in the extreme northwest of Middle-earth, was founded with divine inspiration. It was hidden by mountains and endured for centuries before being betrayed and destroyed. It was the mightiest of the elven homes in the Hither Lands.

Gondolin was founded by King Turgon in the First Age. It was originally named 'Ondolindë'. According to The Silmarillion, the Vala Ulmo, the Lord of Waters, revealed the location of the Vale of Tumladen to Turgon in a dream. Under this divine guidance, Turgon travelled from his kingdom in Nevrast and found the vale. Within the Encircling Mountains, lay a round level plain with sheer walls on all sides and a ravine and tunnel leading out to the southwest known as the Hidden Way. In the middle of the vale there was a steep hill which was called Amon Gwareth, the "Hill of Watch". There Turgon decided to found a city, designed after the city of Tirion in Valinor that the Noldor had left. Turgon and his people built Gondolin in secret. The Hidden Pass was protected by seven gates, all constantly guarded; the first of wood, then stone, bronze, iron, silver, gold, and steel. After it was completed, he took with him to dwell in the hidden city his entire people in Nevrast—almost a third of the Noldor of Fingolfin's House—as well as nearly three quarters of the northern Sindar.

Customs 

The hidden and isolated city of Gondolin developed its own Elvish dialect. Tolkien stated that "This differed from the standard [Sindarin] (of Doriath) (a) in having Western and some Northern elements, and (b) in incorporating a good many Noldorin-Quenya words in more or less Sindarized forms. Thus the city was usually called Gondolin (from Q. Ondolin(dë)) with simple replacement of g-, not Goenlin or Goenglin [as it would have been in standard Sindarin]".

The smiths of Gondolin, using Elven craft, made powerful weapons. In The Hobbit, the swords Orcrist, Glamdring and a long dagger later named Sting were found in a Troll-hoard. Each of these weapons forged in Gondolin had the ability to detect Orcs in the immediate vicinity by glowing. They had the property of striking fear in the hearts of Orcs when used against them.

According to The Book of Lost Tales, the city had seven names: "’Tis said and ’tis sung: Gondobar am I called and Gondothlimbar, City of Stone and City of the Dwellers in Stone; Gondolin the Stone of Song and Gwarestrin am I named, the Tower of the Guard, Gar Thurion or the Secret Place, for I am hidden from the eyes of Melko; but they who love me most greatly call me Loth, for like a flower am I, even Lothengriol the flower that blooms on the plain."

Houses and heraldry 

The Book of Lost Tales states that the active male Elves of Gondolin belonged to one of the 11 "Houses" or Thlim plus the bodyguard of Tuor which was accounted the twelfth. Each house had a distinct symbol: a mole, a swallow, the heavens, a pillar, a tower of snow, a tree, a golden flower, a fountain, a harp, a hammer and anvil, and finally the triple symbol of the King, namely the moon, sun, and scarlet heart worn by the Royal Guard. The scholar of heraldry Catalin Hriban writes that the Gondolin emblems are simply figurative, depicting familiar objects, and that similar devices can be found in standard British texts on heraldry. He notes that Maeglin the traitor, of the House of Moles, fittingly has the colour black; like the animal, his people are miners, used to living underground in the dark.

Fall 

The city stood for nearly 400 years until it was betrayed to Morgoth by Maeglin, Turgon's nephew. Maeglin was captured while mining outside the Encircling Mountains against Turgon's orders. Maeglin betrayed the location of Gondolin after he was promised Lordship as well as Turgon's daughter Idril, whom he'd long coveted.  Morgoth then sent an army over the Crissaegrim, the northernmost precipitous and dangerous portion of the Encircling Mountains, during The Gates of Summer (a great Gondolin festival), catching them unawares and sacking the city with relative ease.  In addition to orcs, Balrogs and dragons, Melkor's (Morgoth's) army, in early versions of the story, included iron machines powered by "internal fires" and used to carry soldiers, to surmount difficult obstacles, and to defeat fortifications. Idril, noted for her intuition, had the foresight to prepare a secret route out of Gondolin prior to the siege. While her father Turgon perished as his tower was destroyed, Idril successfully fled the city, defended by her husband Tuor.

Analysis

Classical literature 

Tolkien scholars including Alexander Bruce and David Greenman have compared the Fall of Gondolin to the sack of Troy, noting that the city was famed for its walls, and likening Tolkien's tale to Virgil's Aeneid.  Both have frame stories, situated long after the events they narrate; both have "gods" (Tolkien's Valar) in the action; and both involve an escape. Greenman finds it fitting that Tuor, "Tolkien's early quest-hero", escapes from the wreck of an old kingdom and creates new ones, just as Aeneas does, while his later quest-heroes in The Lord of the Rings, the hobbits of the Shire, are made to return to their home, ravaged while they were away, and are obliged to scour it clean, just as Odysseus does in Homer's Odyssey.

Greenman compares and contrasts Idril's part in the story to Cassandra and Helen of Troy, two prominent female figures in accounts of the Trojan War: like the prophetess, Idril had a premonition of impending danger and like Helen, her beauty played a major role in instigating Maeglin's betrayal of Gondolin, which ultimately led to its downfall and ruin. Conversely, Greeman notes that Idril's advice to enact a contingency plan for a secret escape route out of Gondolin was heeded by her people, and that she had always rejected Maeglin's advances and remained faithful to Tuor.

Bruce writes that Tolkien's tale parallels Virgil's account, but varies the story. Thus, Morgoth attacks while Gondolin's guard is lowered during a great feast, whereas the Trojans were celebrating the Greeks' apparent retreat, with the additional note of treachery. The Trojan Horse carried the Greeks into Troy, where they set fire to it, paralleled by the fire-serpents which carried "Balrogs in hundreds" into Gondolin. Tolkien's serpents are matched by the great serpents with "burning eyes, fiery and suffused with blood, their tongues a-flicker out of hissing maws" which kill the high priest Laocoön and his sons. Aeneas and his wife Creusa become separated during their escape; her ghost pleads with him to leave when he searches for her, and he travels to Italy; in contrast, Tuor and Idril escape to Sirion together, eventually sailing from there to Valinor.

Tolkien appears to have based one scene on another classical source, Euripides' play The Trojan Women. Maeglin tries to throw Idril's son Eärendil from the city wall, just as Hector's son Astyanax is thrown down from Troy's walls. Tolkien changes the outcome: Eärendil resists, and Tuor appears just in time to rescue him by throwing Maeglin from the walls instead.

According to Hamish Williams, the seven gates of the city of Gondolin may be based on Herodotus's description of the Medean city of Ecbatana with its multi-layered defence on a hill. Williams identifies this as a "perfect space" in the Utopian West of Middle-earth.

Tolkien's wartime experience 

In his book Tolkien and the Great War, John Garth states that Tolkien wrote his 1917 story "The Fall of Gondolin" in hospital after returning to England from the Battle of the Somme. In his view, the tale's first half seems to reflect Tolkien's "slow acceptance of duty" at the start of the war, while the second half "surely reverberates to his collision with war itself."

To defeat Gondolin, Melkor (at first called Melko) uses monsters, Orcs and Balrogs, supported by "beasts like snakes and dragons of irresistible might that should overcreep the Encircling Hills and lap that plain and its fair city in flame and death". The monstrous beasts are not of flesh and blood, but are made by "smiths and sorcerers". There are three kinds, Garth explains: heavy, slow, bronze dragons that can break gaps in Gondolin's walls; fiery monsters, unable to climb the steep smooth hill on which the city sits; and iron dragons in which Orc-soldiers can ride, and which travel on "iron so cunningly linked that they might flow ... around and above all obstacles", and are armoured so that they clang hollowly when bombarded or attacked with fire. Garth comments that these are not so much like mythical dragons as "the tanks of the Somme", and that to the story's Elf-narrator, a combustion engine would look like "a metal heart filled with flame". Anthony Appleyard similarly likens the mechanical dragons to vehicles driven by internal combustion engines.

References

Primary 
This list identifies each item's location in Tolkien's writings.

Secondary

Sources 

 
 
 

Fictional populated places
Middle-earth locations